Norma Jean (formerly known as Luti-Kriss) is an American metalcore band from Douglasville, Georgia, a suburb of Atlanta. Since their inception in 1997, numerous lineup changes have left the band with no original members. To date, Norma Jean has released nine studio albums and received a Grammy Award nomination in 2006 for Best Recording Package for their second album O' God, the Aftermath. The band's name is derived from the real name of actress Marilyn Monroe.

History

Luti-Kriss and debut album (1997–2004)
Norma Jean formed in 1997 under the name Luti-Kriss with Josh Scogin on vocals, guitarists Scottie Henry and Chris Day, Josh Swofford on bass, Mick Bailey on turntables, and Daniel Davison on drums. The band recorded a split EP with Travail that was released in 1999 through Pluto Records. Luti-Kriss's songs from the split would later be released on 5ep, which was released on July 25, 2000 through Pluto Records. The sound of theses EPs differed greatly from future releases, featuring an aggressive nu metal and rap metal style. Shortly after the release of 5ep, Swofford would leave the band and be replaced by Josh Doolittle. The band then would start working on the debut album Throwing Myself, with Bailey leaving during the album's production. 

Evolving from Luti-Kriss, the original Norma Jean lineup consisted of the final Luti-Kriss lineup, utilizing additional percussion on recordings instead of turntables. Drummer Daniel Davison, explained that the band got their name from actress Marilyn Monroe, whose real name is Norma Jeane Baker. It was not until after they decided upon that name that they "were looking at a book" which apparently claimed that "Norma" means "pattern", and "Jean" means "God's grace and mercy", combined into "Patterns of grace and mercy". In 2002 the band released Bless the Martyr and Kiss the Child on Solid State Records. Their original vocalist Josh Scogin left the band shortly after the release of Bless the Martyr and Kiss the Child, stating that "it was just something that I felt led to do." Scogin has been known to join in with Norma Jean during live performances to sing "Memphis Will Be Laid To Waste" since his departure. Original bassist Joshua Doolittle also left the band around the same time as Scogin. Doolittle was replaced by Jake Schultz. Scogin left the band and later went on to start the Chariot; he was replaced by Brad Norris for about a year and nine months.

Early releases (2005–2009)
Brad Norris was later replaced by Cory Brandan, formerly of the bands Eso-Charis, Living Sacrifice and Uses Fire. In March 2005 they released their second album, titled O God, the Aftermath. It was also Cory Brandan's first album performance for Norma Jean. The artwork for the band's second album, O God, the Aftermath was nominated for Best Recording Package at the Grammy Awards of 2006.  The artwork was designed by Asterisk studios in Seattle, Washington.

Redeemer, their third album, was recorded with producer Ross Robinson. On September 21, 2007, original drummer Daniel Davison announced that he would be leaving the band after their current tour ended, via the band's official website. His last show was on November 7, 2007 at Irving Plaza in New York, NY.

On December 17, 2007, Norma Jean announced that they would start writing for their new album, The Anti Mother, in January, record in April, and will be playing the entire 2008 Warped Tour. Writing was officially announced on January 24. On February 13, Norma Jean announced in a Myspace bulletin that they were "about 6 songs deep." They wrote a song with Page Hamilton of Helmet, and collaborated with Deftones' frontman Chino Moreno. The band described the two songs they wrote with Moreno as diverse and anti-traditional. In early to mid February, they announced that their replacement drummer would be Chris Raines, who is also the drummer for the band Spitfire.

On August 5, 2008, Norma Jean released The Anti Mother. Prior to leaving for their headlining tour, Norma Jean shot a music video for "Robots 3 Humans 0", with music video director Daniel Chesnut.

On January 3, 2009, Norma Jean announced on their official website that they would be writing songs for their next album. The band's upcoming fifth studio album was said to be a return "back to [their] roots."

On April 5, 2009, Norma Jean announced on their website that they had dropped off their current tour due to a myriad of reasons.

Signing to Razor & Tie (2009–2015) 
On November 3, 2009, Norma Jean announced that they would be parting ways with longtime label Solid State and signing a deal with independent label Razor & Tie with plans to release an album in the summer of 2010.

Norma Jean announced that a title for one of their new songs will be "Kill More Presidents" and have encouraged fans to film the live performance of this song. The video was released in early March.

Fans could download the first track, titled "Leaderless and Self Enlisted" from "Meridional" by signing up for the band's email list via the band's website.

Norma Jean released their Jeremy Griffith produced album, Meridional, on July 13, 2010.

In an interview with Exclaim! Magazine that was published the day of the Meridional album release, drummer Chris Raines spoke of how the sound of Meridional came to be and what influenced it." The last few records have been doing different things; this one truthfully mixed a lot of those records with what we wanted to do this time. I think we took all the good that we liked from the past records and added the new touch that we wanted to put on it, which was a heavier and darker theme."

Drummer Chris Raines was replaced by Matt Marquez in late 2010 with no formal announcement made for this exchange or if Raines would ever return. In 2016, Raines addressed leaving the band in an interview with Trav Turner (formerly of Aletheian, UnTeachers, Solamors) that it was mainly family issues.
On November 23, 2010, Norma Jean's former record label Solid State Records released a retrospective box set collection titled Birds and Microscopes and Bottles of Elixirs and Raw Steak and a Bunch of Songs. The three CD compilation contains the band's first three studio albums (Bless the Martyr and Kiss the Child, Redeemer and O God, the Aftermath). In January 2011, founding guitarist Scottie Henry decided to take a temporary break from Norma Jean. He would later be replaced by Jeff Hickey, formerly of the Handshake Murders, for 2011 tour dates.

On October 30, 2012, the band announced that they would be going into the studio from December 2012 to January 2013, with Joshua Barber as the chosen producer. It is the first album by the band to feature new members Jeff Hickey on guitar, John Finnegan on bass, and Clayton Holyoak (formerly of Fear Before) on drums. Wrongdoers was released in the US on August 6, 2013 by Razor & Tie, with UK/EU to follow on September 9.

Re-signing with Solid State (2015–present)
In May 2015, they revealed work has begun for their seventh full-length album.

On July 9, 2015, Norma Jean announced the 10th anniversary of O God, The Aftermath North American Tour. They would perform the album in its entirety. The band later announced Sleepwave, '68, and the Ongoing Concept would join them.

On September 15, 2015, they announced they re-signed with Solid State Records, who will release their next album in 2016.

In June 2016, the band announced they had released the first single, "1,000,000 Watts", off the new album, Polar Similar. They released "Synthetic Sun" later that month. On August 11, 2016, Norma Jean released their third single off of Polar Similar, which is titled "Forever Hurtling Towards Andromeda", which features Sean Ingram of Coalesce. Before the release of the album, Putman did an interview with HM Magazine, in which they mentioned their newest member, Rhythm Guitarist Phillip Farris, who replaced Chris Day, the last remaining original member, though no statement was made of his departure. On September 28, 2017, Clayton Holyoak announced that he would be leaving to drum for Every Time I Die. John Finnegan has announced parting ways with Norma Jean.

On January 12, 2019, the band released the single "Children of the Dead" for streaming, with the song being a b-side from the Polar Similar sessions that originally appeared on the deluxe vinyl edition of the album. A music video for the song was released on January 15 via Solid State's official YouTube channel. On May 25, 2019, Norma Jean announced that they had parted ways with longtime guitarist Jeff Hickey.

Norma Jean released their eighth album, All Hail on October 25, 2019.

On June 6th, 2022, Norma Jean announced their ninth album, Deathrattle Sing for Me, to be released August 12, 2022. The album's first single, "Call for the Blood", was released as a music video on June 16.

Touring 

They played at 2006's Ozzfest with Ozzy Osbourne, Disturbed, Avenged Sevenfold, Hatebreed, DragonForce, System of a Down, Lacuna Coil, Black Label Society, Atreyu, Unearth, Bleeding Through, A Life Once Lost, the Red Chord, Walls of Jericho, Strapping Young Lad, All That Remains, Full Blown Chaos, Between the Buried and Me and Bad Acid Trip.

In late 2006, they headlined the Radio Rebellion Tour with support from Between the Buried and Me, Fear Before, Misery Signals and the Fully Down. They played the entire Warped Tour in mid-2008.

On October 3, 2008, Norma Jean embarked on a U.S. headlining tour called "The Anti-Mother Tour". The tour lasted until November 15, 2008 and featured several other bands on Solid State / Tooth & Nail Records including Haste the Day, the Showdown, MyChildren MyBride, Children 18:3, and Oh, Sleeper.  Children 18:3 only appeared on half of the tour dates (October 3–26) while Oh, Sleeper filled in throughout the rest of the tour (October 28 – November 15).

On Thursday, September 17, 2009, Norma Jean announced they would enter a headlining tour spanning over November and December with Horse the Band, the Chariot, and Arsonists Get All the Girls. They also announced that in select cities, they would exclusively play their first album, Bless the Martyr & Kiss the Child, in its entirety. During the tour, the band played a song titled "Kill More Presidents", a B-side from their 2010 release, Meridional.

Norma Jean was on the 2010 Mayhem Festival on the Mayhem Festival side-stage along with Atreyu, In This Moment, and 3 Inches of Blood. Other festival participants include: Korn, Rob Zombie, Lamb of God, Five Finger Death Punch, Hatebreed, Chimaira, Shadows Fall, and Winds of Plague.

From the September 30, 2010 Norma Jean supported Architects on their UK headline tour. Further support came from UK metallers Devil Sold His Soul.
In December 2010 Norma Jean supported Alexisonfire, with drummer Matt Marquez filling in.

In February/March 2011, Norma Jean headlined the "Explosions II Tour" with After the Burial, For the Fallen Dreams, Motionless in White and Stray from the Path.

On April 26, 2013, it was announced that Norma Jean would support the Dillinger Escape Plan on The Summer Slaughter Tour, along with Animals As Leaders, Periphery, Cattle Decapitation, the Ocean, Revocation, Aeon, Rings of Saturn, and Thy Art Is Murder.

On December 12, 2016, Periphery announced that Norma Jean, the Contortionist and Infinity Shred would join them on the "Sonic Unrest Tour II" from March 31 to April 22, 2017.

Musical style
Norma Jean's musical style has primarily been described as metalcore and hardcore punk. Additionally, the band's style and sound has been described as or containing elements of mathcore, post-hardcore, post-metal, sludge metal, and noise rock.

Christianity  
Many have taken Norma Jean to be a Christian band due to Cory Brandan's faith and brief membership in the Christian metal band Living Sacrifice and their history of touring with bands such as Living Sacrifice and Demon Hunter. In an interview in 2015, Brandan said, "I can’t say that we’re a full-on Christian band. I’m a Christian. I can speak for myself, but that’s all I can speak for. I will say that I personally prefer not to play Christian festivals, but at the end of the day, it’s a choice between playing a show and having a day off. I’d prefer to play a show, no matter where it is. We don’t care if we play Christian festivals, but we don’t want to alienate any of our fans. We don’t want to play a show that would make our non-Christian fans uncomfortable enough to not come along, because we care about them too. I mean, they buy our records and merch just like the religious ones do. Probably even more so! I’d even take this one step further and suggest that the label of ‘Christian music’ is stupid - music can’t have a belief. If I clap my hand, you can’t listen to clap and say 'that clap is Christian, or Hindu, or Atheist.' or whatever. It’s a freaking sound. The music itself can’t have a theological belief. We’re musicians first. The content is secondary to that. We write stuff that anyone can relate to. We don’t write anything that will alienate anybody. Well, intentionally, anyway.”

Members 
Current
 Cory Brandan – lead vocals, additional guitars (2004–present), bass (2017–2019)
Grayson Stewart – lead guitar (2019–present), rhythm guitar (2018–2019), bass (2018–2021)
Matt Marquez – drums (2010–2012, 2013, 2019–present)
Clay Crenshaw – bass (2019–present), lead guitar (2019–2021, 2022)
Michael Palmquist - lead guitar (2022-Present), bass (touring 2020)

Former

Josh Scogin – lead vocals (1997–2002)
Scottie H. Henry – lead guitar (1997–2011)
Jeff Hickey – lead guitar (2011–2019), bass (2017–2019)
Chris John Day – rhythm guitar, backing vocals  (1997–2015) 
Josh Swofford – bass (1997–2000)
Josh Doolittle – bass (2000–2002)
Jake Schultz – bass (2002–2012) 
John Finnegan – bass (2013–2017)
Mick Bailey – turntables, samples (1997–2001)
Daniel Davison – drums (1997–2007)
Chris Raines – drums (2007–2010)
Clayton "Goose" Holyoak – drums (2012–2017)
Ryan Leger – drums  (2018–2019)
Phillip Farris – rhythm guitar, backing vocals  (2015–2018, 2019–2021, touring 2022)

Former touring musicians

Brad Norris – lead vocals (2002–2004)
Sebastian Lueth – lead guitar  (2017) 
Igor Efimov – rhythm guitar  (2017)
Billy Nottke – bass (2002)
Christian Prince – bass (2017–2019)
Eric Choi – drums (2017)
Johnny Muench – bass (2019–2020)

Session musicians
Matt Putman – auxiliary percussion (2006), drums (2019)

 Timeline

Discography

Luti-Kriss

Studio albums
 Throwing Myself (2001)

EPs
 Luti-Kriss + Travail with Travail (1999)
 5ep (2000)
 One Night Split with Beloved (2002)

Norma Jean

Studio albums

Music videos

Singles

EPs
2002: Norma Jean / mewithoutYou
Track listing

Compilations
2008: The Almighty Norma Jean Vinyl Boxset
2010: Birds and Microscopes and Bottles of Elixirs and Raw Steak and a Bunch of Songs

Awards
Grammy Awards and nominations
O God, the Aftermath – Best Recording Package, 2006 (nomination)

References

External links
 

1997 establishments in Georgia (U.S. state)
American Christian metal musical groups
American mathcore musical groups
American post-metal musical groups
American progressive metal musical groups
American sludge metal musical groups
Articles which contain graphical timelines
Christian rock groups from Georgia (U.S. state)
Heavy metal musical groups from Georgia (U.S. state)
Metalcore musical groups from Georgia (U.S. state)
Musical groups established in 1997
Musical groups from Atlanta
Razor & Tie artists
Solid State Records artists